An Old Cheltonian (O.C.) is a former pupil of Cheltenham College, a public school in Cheltenham, Gloucestershire, England. The organisation based at the College which coordinates O.C. activity is called the Cheltonian Society. The Cheltonian Society is an all-inclusive organisation for everyone who has an association with College or The Prep.

Service

Fourteen Old Cheltonians have won the Victoria Cross. One has won the George Cross. Many have served with distinction and at high ranks in the  armed forces, government and various walks of public life. (See the Cheltenham College page for details.)

References

External links
The Cheltonian Society - the official website of The Cheltonian Society.